La Salle or Lassalle is a surname. Notable people with the surname include:

 Gadifer de la Salle (1340–1415), French soldier of Norman origin
 Nicolas de la Salle (died 1710), French colonial governor
 Jean-Baptiste de La Salle (1651–1719), Patron saint of Teachers and Founder of Institute of the Brothers of the Christian Schools
 René-Robert Cavelier, Sieur de La Salle (1643–1687), French explorer of North America
 Antoine Charles Louis de Lasalle (1775–1809), French cavalry general during the French Revolution and Napoleonic Wars
 Ferdinand Lassalle (1825–1864), German-Jewish jurist and socialist political activist
 Joseph P. LaSalle (1916–1983), American mathematician known for the LaSalle invariance principle
 Denise LaSalle (1939-2018), American singer
 Eriq La Salle (born 1962), American actor
 Mick LaSalle (born 1959), movie critic for the San Francisco Chronicle